Great Strickland is a village and civil parish in the Eden Valley between the Cumbrian mountains in the west and the Pennines in the east. At the 2011 Census Great Strickland was grouped with Little Strickland, itself enlarged to include Thrimby after 2001, to give a total population of 370. The equivalent figure from the 2001 census was 342.

The sandstone village church is dedicated to Saint Barnabas and was constructed in 1872.  It has a bell turret.

To the west of the village lies the River Leith, the West Coast Main Line and the M6 Motorway. To the south lies the small settlement of Little Strickland.

History 

The village gets its name from a Scandinavian term for pastureland around the 
9th and 10th centuries.

In 1179, the local heiress Christian de Leteham married Walter de Castlecarrock and he changed his name to de Strikeland.

See also 

Listed buildings in Great Strickland
Strickland (surname)

References

External links
 Cumbria County History Trust: Great Strickland (nb: provisional research only – see Talk page)

Civil parishes in Cumbria
Villages in Cumbria
Westmorland